Hayrulla Karimov (born 22 April 1978 in Namangan region, Uzbekistan) is a former Uzbek international footballer.

Career

Club
Karimov started his career in Navbahor Namangan. In 1996, he won Uzbek League with club. He played for Navbahor from 1996 to 2004. In 2005, he joined Mash'al Mubarek and finished runner-up in League. Karimov moved to Bunyodkor in 2008. He is currently one of the leading players of Bunyodkor and captain of the team. On 7 March 2014 Bunyodkor won 2013 UzPFL Supercup and became the only player who won this Cup twice. In 1999, he won first UzPFL Supercup with Navbahor Namangan.

International
Karimov has made 16 appearances for the Uzbekistan national football team.

Career statistics

Club

International

Statistics accurate as of match played 1 April 2017

Honours

Club
Navbahor
 Uzbek League: 1996
 Uzbek Cup: 1998
 Uzbekistan Supercup: 1999

Mash'al
 Uzbek League runner-up: 2005
 Uzbek Cup runner-up: 2006

Bunyodkor
 Uzbek League (4): 2008, 2009, 2011, 2013
 Uzbek Cup (3): 2008, 2012, 2013
 Uzbekistan Supercup: 2013
 AFC Champions League Semifinal (2): 2008, 2012

References

External links

Living people
1977 births
People from Namangan Region
Uzbekistani footballers
Uzbekistan international footballers
FC Bunyodkor players
2007 AFC Asian Cup players
Association football defenders